Koja may refer to:
Kathe Koja, an American writer,
Koja, Jakarta, a subdistrict of North Jakarta
Koja e Kuçit, Albanian Catholic Tribe of Malsia e Madhe
Koja Zaharia, Albanian nobleman